Owain Dando (born 18 November 1990) is a Welsh international lawn bowler. He has represented Wales at the Commonwealth Games and won a bronze medal.

Biography
Dando a police office by trade won the silver medal in the Mens fours at the 2014 Welsh National Bowls Championships. Dando who bowls for the RTB Ebbw Vale BC was selected for the Welsh Elite squad in 2019. Dando won bronze medal in the men's pairs at the 2019 European Championships in Guernsey alongside Daniel Davies.

In 2022, he was selected for the 2022 Commonwealth Games in Birmingham where he competed in two events; the men's triples, where he won a bronze medal and the men's fours.

Dando is a previous winner of the World Indoor Under 25 Mixed Pairs and Indoor British Isles Pairs and Fours Champion.

References 

Welsh male bowls players
Living people
1990 births
Bowls players at the 2022 Commonwealth Games
Commonwealth Games competitors for Wales
Commonwealth Games bronze medallists for Wales
Medallists at the 2022 Commonwealth Games